Kent Peak, at  above sea level is the second highest peak in the Boulder Mountains of Idaho. The peak is also on the border of Sawtooth National Recreation Area and Salmon-Challis National Forest and partially within the Hemingway–Boulders Wilderness. It is the 34th highest peak in Idaho.

The primary route to Kent Peak begins north of Ketchum along Idaho State Highway 75 at the Sawtooth National Recreation Area headquarters.  Take national forest road 146 north from the headquarters until you reach the trailhead at the end of the road.  Trail 115 ascends the ridge to the west of Kent Peak, but the primary class 3 route follows the south ridge.

See also

 Kent Peak (Boundary County, Idaho) - The other Kent peak in Idaho
 List of mountains of Idaho
 List of mountain peaks of Idaho
 List of mountain ranges in Idaho
 List of U.S. states by elevation

References

External links

Mountains of Idaho
Mountains of Custer County, Idaho
Salmon-Challis National Forest
Sawtooth National Forest